Frederick William Pitt (28 February 1883 – 17 November 1935) was an Australian rules footballer who played with South Melbourne in the Victorian Football League (VFL).

External links 

1883 births
1935 deaths
Australian rules footballers from Victoria (Australia)
Sydney Swans players